See You Again is a 2022 Chinese streaming television series. The series is directed by Wang Feng, and stars Hu Yitian, Chen Yuqi, Wang Tian Chen, Bai Bing. The series is airing on iQIYI from September 5 to October 7, 2022.

Synopsis
A famous movie star named Xiang Qinyu lived at Shanghai in 1936. One day, he got gunshot and suddenly found himself time-travelled to modern Shanghai in 2018. He then starts a romantic story with his fan Jin Ayin, and searches for the truth of gunshot.

Cast
 Hu Yitian
 as Xiang Qinyu, a famous movie star time-travelled from 1936
 as Chi Yu, a rookie movie actor
 Chen Yuqi
 as Jin Ayin, a rookie screenwriter, she is also a fan of Xiang Qinyu
 as Jin Zi, a person lived in 1936
 Wang Tian Chen as Li Longda, a rookie movie actor
 Bai Bing as Chen Mumu, a film producer of River Film

Production
The series began filming on March 8, 2021, at Shanghai and wrapped up on June 10, 2021.

References

External links
 
 
 

Chinese time travel television series
IQIYI original programming
2022 Chinese television series debuts